Ali Khalil Qanso was a Lebanese politician who served as a minister for parliamentary affairs in the second cabinet of Saad Hariri. He was the president of the Syrian Social Nationalist Party and he served as minister of state in Najib Mikati government and previously minister of labor in the cabinet of Rafik Hariri.

Early life and education
Qanso was born into a Shiite family in 1948 in Doueir, Lebanon. He received bachelor of arts and master of arts degrees in Arabic literature from Lebanese University.

Political career
Qanso was Minister for Labour of Lebanon in the government of Rafiq Hariri from 2000-03. He was for the 3rd time head of the Syrian Social Nationalist Party from 5 August 2005 to July 2008. 
He again entered into government in July 2008 as Minister of State under Fouad Siniora with the backing of Hezbollah as part of the March 8 Alliance. 

On 5 August 2016, he was elected again as the head of SSNP.

See also
Greater Syria
Syrian presence in Lebanon
Politics of Lebanon

References

External links
"Stumbling block – Who is Ali Kanso, the cabinet nominee causing a stir?", Now Lebanon, 8 July 2008.

  

1948 births
2018 deaths
Government ministers of Lebanon
Lebanese Shia Muslims
Lebanese University alumni
Syrian nationalists
Syrian Social Nationalist Party in Lebanon politicians
People from Nabatieh District